Bhalgran is a village in Poonch District in Azad Kashmir.

Location 
Bhalgran is located an hours drive from the capital of Poonch district, the city of Rawalakot.

Village of  Thorar is in the east of Bhalgran, while the Jhelum River is located in the west of  Bhalgran. It is a beautiful region of this part of Jammu & Kashmir, its sub-parts contain the villages of Sardi, Lway, Dubyern, Rarotha, Chetti Trar, Numb Dumbnota and Hill Koliary.

Bhalgran is  connected  with Rawalpindi and Islamabad via the neighbouring districts of Azad Pattan and Dhalkot, and with Muzaffarabad through  Kohalla. Majority of the population in Bhalgran belong to the Sudhun Tribe.

Literacy 

Literacy rate of Bhalgran is 85%

Sports 
People of this region mostly play volleyball, cricket and Tash(Cards).

Shopping 
The town has few good bazaars where all essential commodities of life are easily available.

Occupation 

There is a large diaspora of people from Bhalgran in the Middle East and Europe, as employment opportunities for the population are non-existent, some find employment with the Military or in government departments.  The area has subsistence level of farming which is not enough to feed a family.

Earthquake of 2005 

The town suffered significant damage from the 2005 Kashmir earthquake; although most of the buildings were left standing, many of them were rendered uninhabitable, and some of the population was left homeless.  Most of the houses have been reconstructed though without the help of the Government of Pakistan or Azad Kashmir.

RDC Sardi Bhalgran 

Due lack of Development in area, in early 2017 people of Sardi Bhalgran started this organization, RDC(Regional Development Council).

Devastating fire of April 2008 

A devastating fire have taken place in Bhalgran Markaz, which is the shopping, health, educational, cultural, religious center for the population around. The fire has burnt down most of the markaz (community center). The damage has left the poor storekeepers bank default and rest of the population without the basic facilities of life. That was another blow down for people of Bhalgran after "2005 Earthquake". 
Bhalgran Rehabilitation Committee has appealed people all over the world to send their donations.

Pictures

See also 
 Thorar

External links 

 Azad Jammu & Kashmir rawalakot
 RDC Sardi Bhalgran website
 Official Web Site of Azad Kashmir

Populated places in Poonch District, Pakistan
2005 Kashmir earthquake